A Principal protected note (PPN) is an investment contract with a guaranteed rate of return of at least the amount invested, and a possible gain.

Although traditional fixed income investments such as guaranteed investment certificates (GICs) and bonds provide investment security with little or no risk of capital loss, they provide modest returns. While stocks have the potential to deliver substantial returns, they do so at much greater risk.

Throughout the unpredictable and volatile market conditions that characterised the late 1990s and early 2000s, investors increasingly sought out new approaches to investing that offered both security and potential growth. Principal protected notes (PPNs) were introduced to the North American financial marketplace at that time.

Part of the structured products category, principal protected notes (also known as Guaranteed Linked Notes), can be linked to a broad range of underlying investments. These investments include indexes, mutual funds, baskets of mutual funds, baskets of stocks and even alternative offerings such as hedge funds.

At the heart of a PPN is a guarantee. Typically, PPNs guarantee 100% of invested capital, as long as the note is held to maturity. That means, regardless of market conditions, investors receive back all money they invested. In other words, at maturity, payout on the Note is the original principal plus any appreciation from the underlying assets (typically a mutual fund or group of funds, an index or basket of equities, and sometimes hedge funds or even commodities).

Principal protected notes may offer an array of benefits such as:

 100% principal protection
 high growth potential
 enhanced income potential
 weekly liquidity
 the opportunity to invest in a broad range of investments
 potential for leveraged returns
 capital protection regardless of what happens in the markets

Principal protected notes may offer disadvantages such as:

 opaque fee structure based on variables over the term of the investment
 payment only at maturation
 underlying investments that the average investor has no hope of understanding
 no prospectus, lack of information as to full details of underlying investment
 custom design causes difficulty in evaluating PPN vs. other PPNs or conventional investments
 lack of data showing how this type of investment has performed historically
 possibility of failure of underlying investments, resulting in loss of principal despite guarantees

Example
A common type of PPN is the stock plus option type. Its return equals  at maturity for underlying call options.

See also
Structured product

External links
 Advisors Asset Management - A public website that describes structured products and unit investment trusts and provides access to these investments.
 Structured Investments - A good explanation many PPN factors, including the typical combination of zero coupon bonds with index options.
The Structured Product LLC - A company focused exclusively on structured products, designed to educate investors as well as investment professionals on the benefits and risks of structured investments.
 UBS Structured Investments - A website that provides educational materials related to principally-protected notes and other structured investments as well as details on issuances of UBS Structured Investments.

References

Principal protected notes
Interest-bearing instruments